The Siege of Multan started in January 1780 and ended on 18 February 1780, it was the result Timur Shah Durrani's reconquest campaigns of Multan after it had been taken in 1772. This siege saw the Afghans successfully re-capture Multan after taking Rohtas months prior.

Background
In 1772, the Afghans lost control of Multan on 25 December 1772. Upon Shuja Khan's death in 1776, Muzzafar Khan succeeded to the control over Shujabad. During this time, Diwan Singh intended to plunder the city and marched on it. However, upon reaching Shujabad, he met fierce resistance, forcing him to withdraw to Multan. The Sikh force however, rampaged the surrounding lands, and as a result, Muzzafar Khan appealed to the aid of the Nawab of Bahawalpur, and Timur Shah Durrani, the Emperor of Afghanistan.

With this, Muzzafar Khan and the Nawab besieged Multan. Ganda Singh dispatched a relief force from Amritsar with himself at its head. During this time, the troops of Muzzafar Khan and the Nawab successfully entered the city after a betrayal from a widow named Rajoo, who opened the gates of the city to the attackers. The Sikh forces retreated to the citadel of Multan, while the city was plundered by Muzzafar Khan and the Nawab's men. However, as the plunder ensued, Ganda Singh's forces arrived, and a skirmish ensued. At the end of this bloody battle, the Nawab and Muzzafar Khan were forced to withdraw.

Later on, Timur Shah sent Baharu Khan, one of his generals, to re-conquer Multan. Baharu Khan's force reached Multan in 1778, and besieged the city. However, Timur Shah was stuck in clashes with his neighbors, forcing the Afghans to withdraw from the siege.

In 1779, Timur Shah embarked on another campaign to Multan. He sent 18,000 men under Zangi Khan to Rohtas, where they defeated the Sikhs in the Battle of Rohtas.

Battle
Early in January 1780, Timur Shah laid siege to Multan. Though the Sikhs were smaller in number, Timur Shah believed his resources were not enough, and as a result, dispatched him alongside a small force to Bahawalpur while leaving the majority of his force at Multan. The Nawab of Bahawalpur gave tribute to Timur Shah and supplied him with 12,000 men as reinforcements. News also came that Jassa Singh, Gujar Singh, Haqiqat Singh, Lahna Singh, and Bhanga Singh alongside several other Sikh chiefs were arriving from Lahore with an army of 15,000 to relieve the city of Multan. Timur Shah left Bahwalnapur and met the Sikh force at Shujabad, where a battle was fought on 8 February 1780. The Sikhs were defeated and lost 2,000 men which were killed or wounded. The Sikh force fled to Lahore and Timur Shah dispatched a force of 20,000 men in pursuit of them. The force overtook the Sikhs at Hujra Muqim Khan, 40 miles west of Lahore, and Timur Shah's force returned to Multan.

From Shujabad, Timur Shah returned to Lahore and stormed the city, which fell. Timur Shah ordered a massacre in the city, and the remaining Sikh force of 7,000 in the city withdrew to the fort of Multan, prompting the Afghans to also lay siege to it. As the Sikh garrison was low in supply, a surrender was negotiated that they would be spared and allowed to return to their homes unharmed. This peace was accepted and the fort of Multan was surrendered to Timur Shah on 18 February 1780.

Aftermath
Following the capture of Multan, Muzzafar Khan was appointed governor of the city with the support of over 20,000 cavalrymen. Multan would not fall unto Sikh control until the Siege of Multan in 1818 by Ranjit Singh.

References

See also 

 Siege of Multan
 Ahmad Shah Durrani
 Indian campaign of Ahmad Shah Durrani

Battles involving the Sikhs